Andrei Costinel Gorcioaia, known professionally as André (or Andrei) Gorin; born 30 November 1987) is a Romanian rugby union player. He plays in the flanker position for amateur Fédérale 1 club Valence d'Agen. He also plays for Romania's national team the Oaks.

References

External links

1987 births
Living people
Romanian rugby union players
Romania international rugby union players
Rugby union flankers
RC Massy players
Romanian expatriate rugby union players
Romanian expatriate sportspeople in France
Expatriate rugby union players in France
Aviron Bayonnais players
Naturalized citizens of France
CS Universitatea Cluj-Napoca (rugby union) players
People from Iași County